Miloon Kothari is a scholar and activist who served from 2000 to 2008 as the United Nations Special Rapporteur on adequate housing with the Human Rights Council. Since 2015, he has been the President of UPR Info. He was convener of the Working Group on Human Rights in India and the UN (WGHR) from 2009 to 2014, an Indian human rights coalition that notably focuses on the Universal Periodic Review. He is the founder of the Delhi-based Housing and Land Rights Network (HLRN), which aims to work toward the "realization of the human rights to adequate housing and land." He currently serves as a member of the UN Commission of Inquiry on the Occupied Palestinian Territory, including East Jerusalem, and Israel.

Kothari was also a visiting scholar at the Department of Urban Studies and Planning at MIT from 2013 to 2014. Kothari has published over 50 works on numerous areas in human rights, policy and law, and activism.

Kothari, who trained as an architect, received his B.A. from Columbia University. He also holds degrees from the Pratt Institute and the Maharaja Sayajirao University of Baroda.

Mondoweiss interview

In an interview with Mondoweiss, Kothari goes further from the observations of a former UN Special Rapporteur, Michael Lynk, who describes "permanent" belligerent occupation as an oxymoron under international law. "It’s been illegal from the beginning," adds Kothari. Both suggest that Israel practices the high crime of apartheid. In the interview, Kothari says "I would go as far as to raise the question of why [Israel is] even a member of the United Nations. Because… the Israeli government does not respect its own obligations as a UN member state. They, in fact, consistently, either directly or through the United States, try to undermine UN mechanisms".

Kothari adds "We are very disheartened by the social media that is controlled largely by–whether it is the Jewish lobby or specific NGOs, a lot of money is being thrown into trying to discredit us, but the important thing is our mandate is based on international human rights and humanitarian standards and that we are all seeking the truth," which provoked condemnation from ambassador Michele Taylor, the Anti-Defamation League, and others. In an article published on 29 July 2022, UN official Navi Pillay defended Kothari against accusations of antisemitism from pro-Israel groups and U.S. officials following his interview with Mondoweiss.

Israel's Prime Minister Yair Lapid called on the United Nations to end its inquiry into the 2021 Israel/Hamas conflict following Kothari's comments.

References

Antisemitism_in_India
Living people
Date of birth missing (living people)
Place of birth missing (living people)
Year of birth missing (living people)
Columbia College (New York) alumni
Indian officials of the United Nations
Maharaja Sayajirao University of Baroda alumni
Pratt Institute alumni
United Nations special rapporteurs